State Highway 100 (SH 100) is a  state highway entirely within Vilas, Colorado, United States, that connects Main Street with U.S. Route 160 (US 160).

Route description

SH 100 begins at an intersection with Main Street and the southern part of County Road 36 (CR 36) in the central part of Vilas. (East Main Street heads east to the eastern edge of town before becoming a county road. West Main Street heads west for one block before ending at Collingwood Avenue. CR 36 heads south to end near the Oklahoma state line.) From its southern terminus, SH 100 heads north to cross Pine Street and connect with the east end of West Cedar Street before leaving the residential part of town. Continuing north SH 100 passes through agricultural area before reaching its northern terminus at an intersection with US 160 and the northern part of CR 36, near the northern edge of town. (US 160 heads east toward Walsh and Johnson City, Kansas. US 160 heads west toward Pritchett and Kim. CR 160 heads briefly north to end at another county road.)

Major intersections

See also

 List of state highways in Colorado

References

External links

100
Transportation in Baca County, Colorado
State highways in the United States shorter than one mile